Foltești is a commune in Galați County, Western Moldavia, Romania with a population of 3,268 people. It is composed of two villages, Foltești and Stoicani.

References

Communes in Galați County
Localities in Western Moldavia
Populated places on the Prut